Vern Lamprell (2 March 1911 – 21 September 1996) was  a former Australian rules footballer who played with Footscray in the Victorian Football League (VFL).

Notes

External links 

1911 births
1996 deaths
Australian rules footballers from Victoria (Australia)
Western Bulldogs players